The Jeep Grand Cherokee (ZJ) is the first generation of the Jeep Grand Cherokee sport utility vehicle. Introduced in 1992 for the 1993 model year, development of the ZJ Grand Cherokee started under American Motors Corporation (AMC) and was continued after the company was acquired by Chrysler in 1987.

Export models produced at the plant in Graz, Austria, were given the vehicle designation of "ZG".

New Features 

The all-new 1993 Jeep Grand Cherokee ZJ offered many new and class-exclusive features that its competitors, such as the Chevrolet S-10 Blazer and Ford Explorer, did not offer.

For example, all Jeep Grand Cherokee ZJ models featured a standard front driver's-side SRS airbag in the steering wheel. The Limited model offered a digital climate control system. All models offered a digital Electronic Vehicle Information Center (EVIC) that monitored critical vehicle systems and provided audible and visual feedback when a fault was detected (doors, hood, tailgate, engine coolant level, engine oil level, and front and rear lighting systems were some of the systems monitored by the EVIC). In addition to monitoring vehicle status, the EVIC could also display current date and time information and vehicle service interval reminders, and could be set via buttons on the EVIC screen. An overhead console provided a mini trip computer with current direction of travel and exterior temperature information in Celsius or Fahrenheit, as well as elapsed time, mileage remaining until the fuel tank is empty, and trip mileage for two trips (Trip A and Trip B). In addition to the mini trip computer, the overhead console provided storage for a single garage door opener, and two pairs of sunglasses, and included four overhead map/reading lamps. Keyless entry allowed for easy access to the vehicle without having to insert the vehicle's key into the door lock cylinder, and could also arm or disarm the class-exclusive vehicle security system. The interior lights illuminated whenever a door was opened, and could shut off automatically along with the automatic headlamps. The ignition cylinder was located on the right side of the steering column, and was lighted so that it could be easily located during nighttime driving conditions. Finally, a premium AccuSound factory audio system by Jensen (or Infinity Gold on 1994 and newer models) and 120-watt amplifier located underneath of the rear bench seat could be paired with an in-dash CD player and five-band graphical equalizer for a high-fidelity audio experience.

A fully mechanical full-time four wheel drive system could split torque when a wheel was losing traction, and send all available traction to that wheel in order to keep moving. In addition, the system, called Quadra-Trac, could automatically detect when four wheel drive was needed, and automatically switch from rear wheel drive without input from the driver.

In 1996, even more new features were added to the Jeep Grand Cherokee ZJ. The newly available Jeep Memory System utilized a button panel located on the inside of the front driver's door panel to recall driver's seat adjustment, mirror adjustments, and radio preset settings when the corresponding key was inserted into the ignition cylinder (each keyless entry remote was engraved with either a '1' or a '2' to designate which key would automatically recall these settings). Heated seats also became available for the front driver and passenger with slide switches located near the lighting controls on the driver's side. A power tilt-and-sliding sunroof was added to the options list, and remote controls for the audio system were added to the back of the steering wheel on some Grand Cherokee models. For the first time on the Grand Cherokee, buyers could choose a combination cassette and single-disc CD player instead of just either a cassette or a single-disc CD player. Dual front SRS airbags now came standard on all models, and the 5.2 L Magnum V8 engine gained 5 lb. ft. of torque, up to 285 from 280, and remained one of the most powerful SUVs in its class.

Finally, in 1998, the 5.9 L Limited model became available for the Jeep Grand Cherokee ZJ, utilizing Chrysler's 360 cubic inch (5.9 L) Magnum electronically fuel-injected V8 engine producing 245 horsepower and 345 lb. ft. of torque, which made the Grand Cherokee ZJ 5.9 L Limited the most powerful SUV in its class.

Production changes

Introduction

The Grand Cherokee (ZJ) was initially available in three trim levels: base, Laredo, and Limited. The base model included features such as full instrumentation, cloth interior, a standard five-speed manual transmission, and was given the "SE" name for the 1994 model year. Power windows and locks were not standard equipment on the base and SE for 1993 and 1994. The minimal difference in price resulted in low consumer demand, so the low-line model was discontinued after 1994. Standard features on all models included a driver-side airbag and four-wheel anti-lock braking system (ABS). The Laredo was the mid-scale model with standard features that included power windows, power door locks, and cruise control. Exterior features included medium-grey plastic paneling on the lower body and five-spoke aluminum wheels. The Limited was the premium model, featuring lower body paneling that was the same color as the rest of the vehicle. The Limited also had standard features such as leather seating, power sunroof, heated mirrors, heated power seats, and a remote keyless system. The "Up-Country" version was also offered between 1993 and 1997. It came with 4WD and the AMC straight-6 4.0 L engine. Package groups included: convenience, fog lamps, skid plate, lighting, luxury, power, security, and trailer towing.

When it was first introduced in April 1992 as an early 1993 model year vehicle, the Grand Cherokee had one powertrain, the AMC-derived 4.0 L Power Tech I6 engine that produced 190 horsepower. Transmission choices were a four-speed automatic transmission (early production ZJs used the AW4; the A500SE (later 42RE) replaced the AW4 during the latter half of the 1993 model year) or an Aisin AX15 manual transmission. Low sales demand for the manual transmission resulted in its discontinuation after the 1994 model year for North America, but it remained on the option list for European ZJs. The drivetrain choices included rear-wheel drive or four-wheel-drive.

1993
The all-new, 1993 Jeep Grand Cherokee went on sale in April 1992 in Base, Laredo, and Limited trims. At launch all Grand Cherokees were powered by the 4.0 L Power Tech Inline Six-Cylinder engine, and were all four-wheel drive. Starting in early 1993, the Grand Cherokee became available with the 5.2 L Magnum V8 engine, and a Grand Wagoneer model became available with standard four-wheel drive and V8 power, as well as a plush leather-trimmed interior and faux vinyl woodgrain side and tailgate paneling. The 5.2 L Magnum V8 engine was available with the Quadra-Trac four-wheel drive system, which was based around a NV249 transfer case with a viscous coupler. The Quadra-Trac system was a permanent four-wheel drive system that allowed up to 60% of power to the rear wheels and a 50–50 split when loss of rear traction occurred. It also had a low range that still utilized the viscous coupler in the 1993-1995 model years. In 1996 and beyond, the low range provided a true 50-50 lock between the front and rear axles. However, the system required little to no driver input, as it was automatically determined by the viscous coupler when more front bias was required. In addition to Quadra-Trac, a Selec-Trac Full-Time four-wheel drive system was available that was a "Shift-on-the-Fly" four-wheel drive system that had a 4-wheel drive part-time mode (50/50 lock) a 4-wheel drive full-time mode (variable front bias, much like the Quadra-Trac) and a 4 LO. The standard part-time four-wheel drive system in the Grand Cherokee was known as Command-Trac, a part-time only four-wheel drive, modes were 2 wheel drive, 4 HI and 4 LO. All three four-wheel drive systems featured a selector lever that was located next to the transmission gear selector or shifter. Two Wheel Drive Grand Cherokees featured a small storage area in place of the four-wheel drive selector lever.

Late 1992/early 1993 production
In late 1992/early 1993 calendar year, Chrysler made some minor changes to the 1993 model year Grand Cherokee. The changes are shown in The New Jeep, a brochure on the 1993 Jeep Grand Cherokee published in 1992. The crimson-colored interior option for the vinyl and cloth seats was no longer available, and the Limited model now had the option of quilted Highland-grain leather seats. The 5.2 L High-Output Magnum Engine V8 producing 220 horsepower was added in early 1993. The only transmission choice was a 46RH, four-speed automatic transmission. The top-of-the-line Grand Wagoneer trim was also shown in the brochure, and became available in early 1993. The radio face was changed for the AM/FM cassette player in early 1993, with raised buttons and rounded knobs, as well as larger green display text to match the rest of the Grand Cherokee's interior. The radio also introduced Dolby noise reduction technology for the cassette player. Full-faced steel wheels replaced the six-spoke version on the Base/SE model.

1994
For 1994, the upgraded Jensen Electronics AccuSound premium amplified audio system was rebranded Infinity Gold, with upgraded components. An AM/FM stereo with in-dash CD player became available for the first time. Mid-level Laredo models gained standard fifteen-inch sport aluminum-alloy wheels. The Grand Wagoneer model was dropped for 1994, while the Base trim level is renamed the SE. The Aisin AW4 four-speed automatic transmission was replaced for 1994, becoming the Chrysler-built 42RE.

1995
The AMC 4.0 L straight-6 engine, rated to tow , was also refined with more torque and quieter operation.

An uplevel Orvis Edition model of the Grand Cherokee was introduced in partnership with Orvis catalog, adding features to the uplevel Limited model such as perforated tan and Moss Green leather-trimmed seating surfaces and front and rear door panels, an AM/FM stereo with in-dash CD player as an option, and unique exterior trim and fifteen-inch aluminum-alloy wheels with green inserts to the Limited trim. A flip out rear glass hatch was a new option for the Orvis, along with font lettering which was similar to other Chrysler products (which was phased in the following model year). The base SE trim level received more standard equipment such as power windows and door locks, Antilock Braking System (ABS), keyless entry, an AM/FM stereo with cassette player, air conditioning, and upgraded fifteen-inch styled steel wheels. The five-speed Aisin AX15 manual transmission was also no longer available for 1995.

1996 Restyling 
For 1996, the Grand Cherokee received a mid-cycle restyling, with new front and rear bumpers and side cladding, a larger front grille, new aluminum-alloy wheel options, and an entirely new interior, now featuring a front passenger side airbag and revised interior fabrics. A combination AM/FM stereo with cassette and CD players became available, as well as a rear-mounted multi-disc CD changer unit. The five-speed manual transmission option was also dropped for 1995. At this time, the part-time Command-Trac four-wheel drive system was dropped, leaving the full-time Selec-Trac and computerized Quadra-Trac four-wheel drive systems as options.

A new steering wheel which featured three-spokes with integrated cruise control buttons, a new dual-note horn, and the horn buttons were deleted in favor of a single horn pad. The front seats were new as well as an upgraded interior with new door panels and interior trim panels, a glove box with more storage space, new tires and wheels, revised headlamps, fog lamps that were directly integrated into the vehicle's front bumper on some models, a new remote keyless system, as well as faux wood interior trim standard on all models. An optional rear lift glass (first introduced with the 1995 Orvis edition where production tailgates manufactured after January 3, 1995 have both provisions for both fixed and lift glass) for the Laredo and Limited were added to the options list (the fixed glass came standard). The Grand Cherokee now offered standard power windows, power door locks, rear door child locks, keyless entry, AM/FM radio with cassette player and compact disc player and four standard speakers, cloth seating surfaces, and more. The manual transmission was no longer offered after the 1994 model year Grand Cherokee sold in North America, but remained as the only transmission for European ZJs (ZG) sold in Europe with the diesel motor.

New front door designs got new side body cladding strips, and the 'Laredo' subtext on the Laredo model was moved down to the cladding. The 'Grand Cherokee' badge was relocated to the front lower doors, and was now larger (using a font style similar to other Chrysler products and initially used with the 1995 Orvis package), replacing the 1974-era American Motors font style used on Jeep vehicles. On V8-equipped Grand Cherokees, there was a new V8 badge on the rear liftgate. The 4X4 badge, on four-wheel-drive-equipped Grand Cherokees, was also changed to raised metal letters instead of the 4X4 decals offered before.

The vehicle featured an OBD II diagnostics port under the dashboard on the driver's side, required for all 1996 model year and newer vehicles, a digital odometer and trip odometer, a 120 miles per hour speedometer rating on some models, and the vehicle now included some user-programmable features such as if the headlamps and tail lamps flashed when a button was pressed on the remote keyless system, how many miles until service intervals, whether the horn sounded when a button was pressed on the remote, and more. The overhead console was somewhat redesigned for the 1996 model year to improve storage space and feature availability. In addition to the cigarette lighter port, a 12-volt power port was added for cellular telephones, coolers, computers, and other devices. The ashtray was also removed from the rear doors, replaced by a solid area. The Limited model and Orvis Edition model both got chrome interior door handles.

The 4.0 engine rating was reduced by 5 horsepower to 185 to meet EPA regulations for the 1996 model year production.

1997
For 1997, a new trim level of Grand Cherokee, the Special Edition, was introduced, adding the Infinity Gold premium amplified audio system, an AM/FM stereo with cassette and CD players, dual power-adjustable front bucket seats, color-keyed exterior trim, and a security system to the base Laredo model. The TSi, also based on the base Laredo model, added unique sixteen-inch sport aluminum-alloy wheels, unique front and rear bumpers and side cladding, an AM/FM stereo with cassette and CD players, dual power-adjustable front bucket seats, luxury leather-trimmed seating surfaces with dual heated front bucket seats, dark gray wood interior trim, and a security system to the Laredo trim. The 5.2 L Magnum V8 engine was now available with 2-wheel-drive (Rear-Wheel-Drive). The Orvis Edition was in its last production year for 1997, available in Moss Green and a Birch Silver exterior color.

1998
For 1998, the first-generation Jeep Grand Cherokee (ZJ) entered its final year of production. The Laredo and other models were carried over, and the new 5.9L Limited Edition was introduced and exclusive to this year model.

Production of the first-generation Jeep Grand Cherokee ZJ ended in mid-1998, as production of the next generation Jeep Grand Cherokee (WJ) began at Jefferson North Assembly.

Between 1996 and 1998, the export Grand Cherokee Laredo (marketed for Japan) had the optional Aspen package (source: The Story of Jeep).

In 1998, a 5.9 L Limited model featured the 5.9 L V8 Magnum engine producing  with all-wheel-drive and a four-speed automatic transmission. This engine and model was only available for the 1998 model year. This Limited model featured the 5.9 L Magnum V8 engine from the Dodge Ram 1500 pickup truck, unique forged sixteen-inch aluminum-alloy wheels, unique ruffled luxury leather-trimmed seating surfaces and front and rear door panels, an AM/FM stereo with cassette and CD players, a unique ten-speaker, 180-watt Infinity Gold premium amplified audio system, a unique mesh grille and a vented performance hood to the standard Limited model. The 5.9 also included working hood vents, upgraded alternator, and unique exhaust. The 1998 5.9 L was the then fastest production SUV, having a measured 0-60 time (by Road and Track) of 6.8 seconds—a time that would not be beat until almost ten years later, with Jeep's SRT.

Fleet markets 
In the mid-late 2000s (as they passed the 15 year mark), Japanese Domestic Market (JDM) Jeep Grand Cherokees that came in right hand drive became a popular vehicle choice for Canadian Mail Carriers since it shared the same chassis, body, suspension, and engine as the North American left hand drive version.

Models 

The 1993-1998 Jeep Grand Cherokee ZJ was available in many, distinct trim levels:

The Base and SE (1993-1995) were the most basic trim levels of the Grand Cherokee between 1993 and 1995. The Base was given a name, the SE, in 1994. Standard features included the 4.0L "Power-Tech" Inline Six-Cylinder (I6) engine with 5-speed manual transmission, full instrumentation, vinyl-and-cloth trimmed seating surfaces, front high-back bucket seats, a split-folding rear 60/40 bench seat, an AM/FM stereo with 4 speakers, manual roll-up windows and door locks, and fifteen-inch (15") styled steel wheels. In 1995, the SE gained standard power windows and door locks, as well as keyless entry, air conditioning, an AM/FM stereo with cassette player, warning chimes, and a 4-speed automatic transmission. The SE was dropped after 1995, and in 1996, the Laredo became the base trim level of the Grand Cherokee.

The Laredo (1993-1998) served as the midrange trim level of the Grand Cherokee between 1993 and 1995, and the base trim level of the Grand Cherokee between 1996 and 1998. It added these features to the base SE Grand Cherokee: fifteen-inch (15") alloy wheels, an AM/FM stereo with cassette player, air conditioning, warning chimes, cloth seating surfaces, keyless entry, power windows and door locks, a chrome front grille, and body-side cladding and molding. In 1996, the Laredo became the base trim level of the Grand Cherokee, and remains the base trim level to this day. In 1995, the Laredo gained a standard 4-speed automatic transmission, as the 5-speed manual transmission was dropped after 1994. Many of the features available on the luxurious Limited model could also be had on the midrange or base Laredo model.

The Special Edition (1997-1998) was slotted just above the base Laredo trim Grand Cherokee between 1997 and 1998. It added the following features to the basic Laredo trim: a premium 120-watt Infinity Gold sound system with 6 speakers, an AM/FM stereo with cassette and CD players, power front bucket seats, a security system, color-keyed body-side trim and front and rear bumpers (sourced from the Limited), a 'Special Edition' emblem on both front doors, and more.

The TSi (1997-1998) served as the "sporty" trim level of the Grand Cherokee between 1997 and 1998. Slotted above the base Laredo trim, the TSi added additional features to the basic Laredo trim that included sport alloy wheels, blue front and rear bumper and side trim accents, sport leather-trimmed and perforated seating surfaces, heated front bucket seats, an AM/FM stereo with cassette and CD players, a premium 120-watt Infinity Gold sound system with 6 speakers, and a security system.

The Limited (1993-1998) served as the "luxury" trim level of the Grand Cherokee between 1993 and 1998. It added these features to the midrange Laredo Grand Cherokee: premium leather-trimmed seating surfaces, premium low-back front bucket seats, power front seats, a premium 120-watt Infinity Gold sound system with 6 speakers, fifteen-inch (15") or sixteen-inch (16") luxury alloy wheels, a security system, 4-speed automatic transmission, an Electronic Vehicle Information Center (EVIC or VIC), carpeted floor mats, body-colored front grille, front and rear bumpers, gold-plated badging, and body-side cladding and trim, and more.

The Orvis Edition (1995-1997) was a partnership between the Orvis catalog and Jeep. Based on the Limited model, and available between 1995 and 1997, it offered two exterior color options, either Moss Green Pearl Coat or Light Driftwood Pearl Coat, an AM/FM stereo with CD player, unique beige-and-green luxury leather seating surfaces with red piping and matching door panel accents, luxury fifteen-inch (15") or sixteen-inch (16") alloy wheels with Moss Green-painted accents, a power sunroof, heated front bucket seats, unique beige-and-green carpeted floor mats with red piping, a beige-and-green leather spare tire and spare wheel cover with integrated storage pockets, and more. Jeep ended their partnership with Orvis in 1997, and thus, the Orvis Edition Grand Cherokee was discontinued after 1997.

The 5.9 L Limited (1998 only) The 5.9 Limited was a Jeep Grand Cherokee produced only for the 1998 model year, having more luxury and performance than that of the regular Limited. Chrysler manufactured nearly a quarter million Grand Cherokees in 1998. Of those, fewer than fifteen thousand were 5.9s. It housed a Magnum 5.9 L V8 engine with an output of 245 hp (183 kW) and 345 lb·ft (468 N·m) of torque, going from zero to 60 mph (100 km/h) in 7.3 seconds[6] (Motor Trend measured this at a slightly faster 6.8 seconds[7]), making it the quickest SUV available that year. The performance of the 1998 5.9 L V8 has been surpassed by Jeep only with the introduction of the 2006 Jeep Grand Cherokee SRT-8, which housed a 6.1 L Hemi Engine.[8] The 5.9 Jeep Grand Cherokee was named the 1998 four-wheel drive vehicle of the year by Petersen's 4-Wheel & Off-Road magazine.[6]
The 5.9 Limited was available only in Deep Slate, Stone White, Bright Platinum. European version named 5.9 Limited LX and had two additional colors: Forest Green and Deep Amethyst.

The 5.9 Jeep Grand Cherokee included a number of improvements over the top of the line "limited" Grand Cherokee, that were unique to the 5.9. This included, in addition to the premium motor, all the options found on the limited edition, in addition to:[7]
a higher output alternator
revised low profile roof racks (used on the next generation)
unique wood grain accents
full calf nap leather interior
chrome tipped exhaust
unique front grille
unique side rocker panels
fully functional heat extractor hood louvers
rear leather armrest
higher output Infinity premium stereo system with trunk speakers bar
leather wrapped shift and e-brake handles
unique leather door inserts, armrests and console lid
unique five star wheels
black sidewall (BSW) tires
electric cooling fan in lieu of a mechanical clutch fan used with the 5.2

The Grand Wagoneer served as the most luxurious Grand Cherokee trim level for 1993, offering features in addition to the luxurious Limited features: quilted leather seating surfaces, faux vinyl wood side paneling, 'Grand Wagoneer' emblems on both upper front fenders, more wood interior trim, the deletion of the body-side cladding panels, the 5.2 L Magnum V8 engine, 4X4 only, and a chrome front grille. Meant to pay homage to the then-recently discontinued Jeep Grand Wagoneer SJ, the Grand Wagoneer was discontinued after 1993.

Engines

Transmissions

4x4 systems 
Four-wheel drive systems included Command-Trac, a part-time unit offering temporary 4-wheel assistance; Command-Trac was dropped from lineup in conjunction with the SE trim in 1996. Selec-Trac had the option of either full-time or part-time operation; both shift-on-the-fly Command-Trac and Selec-Trac were already available for the Cherokee, and they were adapted to the Grand Cherokee. Exclusive to the Grand Cherokee was the introduction of Quadra-Trac system with permanent all-time four-wheel assistance. This was optional on all models. Low-range required using a manual shift lever for all three systems.

Suspension 
The Quadra-Link suspension design was used on both the front and rear axles. This design uses four control arms, two above the axle and two below it, to control longitudinal movement and rotation about the lateral axis (drive and braking reaction). A panhard rod, also referred to as a track bar, is used to locate the axle laterally. Two coil springs are seated on top of the axle housing as well as two gas-charged shock absorbers. The optional "Up Country" package included heavier duty German made gas charged shocks installed upside down, taller coil springs and longer bump stops; thereby increasing ride height by one inch.

Special edition ZJs 

There were several different "one-off" and special edition models of the ZJ.

Grand Wagoneer (1993) 

Following the introduction of the all-new 1993 Grand Cherokee ZJ, Jeep introduced an "ultra-luxury" model of its all-new midsize SUV, called the Grand Wagoneer. Based on the Grand Cherokee Limited and paying tribute to the Jeep Grand Wagoneer SJ of which the Grand Cherokee ZJ replaced, the Grand Wagoneer included a standard 5.2L "Magnum" High-Output V8 engine and the new "Quadra-Trac" computerized full-time four wheel drive (4X4) system, both of which were optional on all other Grand Cherokees. Additional features on top of the Limited included exclusive faux woodgrain vinyl decals on the front fenders, doors, and rear tailgate, chrome Grand Wagoneer emblems on both front fenders, deletion of the lower textured body side cladding, unique pinstripes on the front and rear bumpers and above the woodgrain decals on both sides of the vehicle, color-keyed heated power-adjustable side mirrors, a chrome front grille, front bumper-mounted driving (fog) lamps, a color-keyed leather-wrapped tilt steering wheel with cruise control, ultra-luxury quilted leather-trimmed seating surfaces, a security system, and a full-size, matching cargo area-mounted spare tire and wheel with vinyl cover. The Grand Wagoneer was available in several different exterior color options, although all interiors were beige in color, regardless of exterior color. Options were very limited, as the Grand Wagoneer had a long list of standard equipment, although an A/M-F/M radio with graphic equalizer and single-disc CD player was available as an option (the Grand Cherokee ZJ was one of the first midsize SUV's to offer a factory-installed, in-dash CD player as an option). As there was not a large market for the Grand Cherokee ZJ-based Grand Wagoneer, it was discontinued after the 1993 model year, once again leaving the Limited as the top-of-the-line Grand Cherokee trim level.

Orvis Edition (1995–1997) 

The Orvis (1995–1997) was a Grand Cherokee Limited package that featured an exterior color scheme of Moss Green, or in 1997 the (less common) Light Driftwood, with roan red and maize side strip accents (1995). Moss Green paint accents on the road wheels (matching the moss green body color) and the special "Orvis" brand badging were the only significant exterior visual differences. In performance, the 5.2 V8 engine became standard, but was available with a 4.0 inline 6-cylinder engine. Also, some Orvis editions came with a rear liftglass (which in 1996 became a mainstream option), tow hooks, and the Up-Country suspension group. However, the interior was special. Two-tone green and tan leather seats were complemented with roan red accent piping and Orvis insignia. There was a slight difference between the 1996 and 1997 years' interior compared to each other. The 1996 had a black dash where the 1997 had a tan dash, The Orvis Edition luxury trim package was optional on the Limited version, and when equipped with all the other options was the most expensive of all the Grand Cherokee versions until 1998 when the 5.9 Limited was introduced. Jeep ended their relationship with Orvis Catalog in 1997, and the Orvis Edition was discontinued. However in Europe, the ZJ (ZG) Orvis Special Edition in RHD form now became the ultimate. Boasting all the Orvis extras, plus features such as Bonnet (Hood) vents from the 5.9, this exclusively high output 4.0 6 cylinder (195 bhp) 3:73 standard gearing car was offered in Platinum Mist Metallic with Black Leather and wood trim, complete with an Option Free list (except Tow Pack), 0-60 of 8.1, and a factory top speed of 132 mph.

Production numbers of the Orvis Editions are:
 1995: 10,020
 1996: 2,341
 1997: 2,733
(Note - European (ZG) 4.0 HO model Orvis - estimated at a couple of hundred in RHD).

TSi (1997–1998) 

A sporty TSi model (1997–1998) was briefly offered, with exterior features that included single color body paneling with lower indigo blue striping, a body colored grille, and TSi accents. The TSi trim level was first used on the turbocharged, intercooled version of the 1986-89 Chrysler Conquest before it transferred to Eagle and was applied to performance-oriented 1990-98 Talons and 1993-97 Visions from Jeep's sister brand. The TSi trim was applied to the Grand Cherokee to create a stronger connection between Jeep and Eagle, as Eagle sales had been in the doldrums by 1997.

The TSi could only be ordered in select colors, which included Black, Platinum, and Deep Amethyst. TSi packages came equipped with 5 spoke  alloy wheels, 225/70R16 Goodyear Eagle GA tires, fog lights, Luxury group, featuring: "Highland" perforated, power, leather seats, overhead computer, and a premium sound system with steering wheel mounted controls. Contrary to popular belief, the suspension used on the TSi was the standard duty Quadra-Coil suspension used on all non-UpCountry ZJs. Both the 4.0 I6 and the 5.2 V8 were available. Quadra-Trac was standard with the TSi package for both engines, while Selec-Trac was optional with the I6. Both engine options could also be special ordered in 2 wheel drive configurations. The TSi was priced between the Laredo and the Limited and was discontinued after a two-year run.

5.9 Limited (1998) 
The 5.9 Limited was produced only for the 1998 model year, having more luxury and performance than that of the regular Limited. Chrysler manufactured nearly a quarter million Grand Cherokees in 1998. Of those, fewer than fifteen thousand were 5.9s. Because of this, unlike other Grand Cherokee models, the 5.9 Limited required premium unleaded gasoline. The 5.9 Jeep Grand Cherokee was named the 1998 four-wheel drive vehicle of the year by Petersen's 4-Wheel & Off-Road magazine.

The 5.9 Limited was available only in Deep Slate, Stone White, and Bright Platinum. European version named 5.9 Limited LX and had two additional colors: Forest Green and Deep Amethyst.

The 5.9 Jeep Grand Cherokee included unique features. These included all the options from the Limited and the following:
 a higher output alternator
 Low profile roof rack (used on the next generation)
 Unique wood grain accents
 Calf's leather interior
 Chrome exhaust tip
 Unique front grille
 Unique side rocker moldings
 Functional heat extracting hood louvers
 Leather arm rest in rear seating position
 6-channel Infinity premium stereo (includes rear door subwoofers, and cargo area soundbar)
 Leather wrapped shifter and emergency brake handles
 Unique leather door inserts, armrests and console lid
 Unique five star wheels
 46RE 4-speed automatic transmission
 3.73 differential gearing with rear Trac-Loc
 Requires premium gasoline

Safety

Insurance Institute for Highway Safety (IIHS)

NHTSA

Awards 
The Grand Cherokee V8 was on Car and Driver magazine's Ten Best list and was Motor Trend magazine's Truck of the Year for 1993.
It was also Petersen's 4x4 of the Year in 1993, 1996 (with the redesigned NV249 transfer case), 1998 (with the newly available 5.9 L V8), 1999 (with its acclaimed second generation model), 2001 (with the new 5-speed transmission), and 2005 (with its third generation model).
The Grand Cherokee V8 received many awards from smaller enterprises, newspapers, and blogs such as Best Vehicle of the Year from the Asheville Chronicle 1996–2000, Beta Blog's Best Family 4X4 1995–1998, and "Best 4x4" from Bearded Monthly.
Since 2011, the latest WK2 Grand Cherokee has been dubbed the "Most Awarded SUV Ever" due to the number of awards it received when it was redesigned in 2011.

2017 Jeep Grand One Concept 
Jeep introduced several concept vehicles for its annual Easter Safari in Moab, Utah. One such vehicle was the Jeep Grand One, which was created to celebrate the 25th anniversary of the Jeep Grand Cherokee. This vehicle was based on a stock Stone White 1993 Jeep Grand Cherokee ZJ Laredo 4X4 equipped with the 5.2 L Magnum High-Output V8 engine and 46RH 4-speed automatic transmission, which the automaker purchased off of Craigslist specifically for the project. The Grand One was repainted a robin's-egg blue with a light woodgrain-style treatment underneath of the paint, paying homage to the 1993 Jeep Grand Wagoneer ZJ, and the wheelbase was stretched to accommodate new front and rear axles (however, this is only noticeable if one looks at the slightly modified rear doors that had to be modified to accommodate the longer wheelbase). Large front and rear fender flares conceal the extended wheelbase. The Grand One also receives large, off-road capable tires, custom eighteen-inch laced aluminum-alloy wheels, a slight lift, an eight-slot gloss black-finished front grille, 2017 Jeep Grand Cherokee-style 'GRAND CHEROKEE' emblems on the front doors and rear tailgate, and a new '5.2' emblem on the rear tailgate. Pinstripes on the side and rear of the body were removed, as was the textured side cladding, and the 'Jeep' emblem on the hood. Underneath the Grand One's hood, all components are stock Jeep except for a Mopar air filter and intake. Inside, the interior of the Grand One is mostly stock, except for new upholstery (the stock seats of the Grand One were re-wrapped in a modern gray leather-and-microfiber-suede with bright blue accent stitching), and a plaid headliner. Retro touches, such as the factory AM/FM radio with cassette player that has a cassette tape sticking out of the tape deck, an Audiovox car phone, and an original Nintendo Game Boy on the rear seat are eminent on the Grand One, paying tribute to the Jeep Grand Cherokee's history.

References

External links

 

Grand Cherokee (ZJ)
Rear-wheel-drive vehicles
All-wheel-drive vehicles
Cars introduced in 1992
Mid-size sport utility vehicles
Motor vehicles manufactured in the United States